Earnest E. Winburn (April 26, 1897 – November 25, 1953) was an American football end who played one season for the St. Louis All-Stars of the National Football League. He played in 1923, the All-Stars' only season.

Winburn was born on April 26, 1897, in either Lee's Summit, Missouri or Belton, Missouri. He went to two high schools: Lee's Summit High School and Wentworth Military School, both in Missouri. He went to Central Missouri State College and played football there, being one of only eight "Mules" to ever play in the NFL. In 1923, Winburn played his first and only season professionally, playing in one game for the St. Louis All-Stars. During his one season, he was 5 feet 11 inches tall, and 175 pounds. Winburn did not make any appearances after the season as the All-Stars folded from the league. Winburn died on November 25, 1953, at the age of 56.

References

1897 births
1953 deaths
St. Louis All-Stars players